Bhucho Mandi is a suburb of Bathinda and a municipal council in Bathinda district in the state of Punjab, India.

Demographics
According to the 2011 census, Bhucho Mandi has population of 14,961 of which 7,805 are males and 7,156 are females. The female sex ratio was 917 against the state average of 895.

Children aged 0–6 numbered 1,718 (11.48%). The child female sex ratio was around 928 compared to the state average of 846.

The literacy rate was 76.25%, higher than state average of 75.84%. Male literacy was 82.14% and female literacy 69.82%.

Economy
Mandi is known for its  marbles, tiles and carpets work. It is a centre for the trade for farmers from near by villages.

The Bhucho Mandi area has one of the biggest food-grain and cotton markets in Bathinda.

Industries in Bhucho Mandi include cotton ginning, rice mill, non-woven fabric carry bags, cotton cake and oil factories.

Politics
Bhucho Mandi is divided into 13 wards for which elections are held every five years. Once known as a well planned city is now the days due to apathy of state government is becoming the dirties city.

References

Bathinda
Cities and towns in Bathinda district